Andrée Ehresmann (born Andrée Bastiani; 1935) is a French mathematician specialising in category theory.

Education and career 
Ehresmann was a researcher at CNRS from 1957 to 1963. She was awarded a Ph.D. in 1962 at University of Paris under the supervision of Gustave Choquet. Her thesis was entitled Différentiabilité dans les espaces localement convexes. Distructures [Differentiability in locally convex spaces. Distructures].

In 1967 she became a professor at IRCAM, at the University of Picardie Jules Verne, where she is currently emeritus professor.

Research 
Ehresmann has published over a hundred works on Analysis (Differential Calculus and Infinite-dimensional Distributions, Guiding Systems and Optimization Problems), Category Theory (with her husband, Charles Ehresmann: sketches and internal categories, multiple categories, closed monoidal structures) and the modeling of complex autonomous systems (Memory Scalable Systems, including the MENS model for neuro-cognitive systems).

She developed, with J.-P. Vanbremeersch a model of Memory Evolutive Systems, which proposes a mathematical model for 'living' systems with a hierarchy of complex components with multiple temporalities, such as biological, neuro-cognitive, or social systems. Based on a theory of 'dynamic' categories, evolving memory systems can analyze complexity, emergence and self-organization.

She is the director of the mathematical journal Cahiers de Topologie et Géométrie Différentielle Catégoriques.

Notes and references

External links 
  Intervention d'Andrée Ehresmann à la conférence « Mathématiques innovantes 2010 »

1935 births
Living people
20th-century French mathematicians
Category theorists
French women mathematicians
20th-century women mathematicians
20th-century French women
Academic staff of the University of Picardy Jules Verne